Catch the Fire may refer to
 Catch the Fire World, world-wide evangelical Christian church based in Toronto, Canada
 Catch the Fire Ministries, Australian organization founded by Danny Nalliah

See also
 Catch a Fire (disambiguation)
 Catching Fire (disambiguation)